Craiglwyn is a top of Creigiau Gleision in Snowdonia, Wales, near Capel Curig. It lies at the south end of the Creigiau Gleision ridge, and offers good views of Carnedd Dafydd, Pen yr Helgi Du, Pen Llithrig y Wrach, Gallt yr Ogof, Tryfan and Moel Siabod.

References

External links
www.geograph.co.uk : photos of Creigiau Gleision and surrounding area

Mountains and hills of Snowdonia
Nuttalls
Mountains and hills of Conwy County Borough
Trefriw